Khitan or Khatna is the Arabic term for circumcision, and the Islamic term for the recommended practice of male circumcision in Islamic culture. Male circumcision is widespread in the Muslim world, and accepted as an established practice by all Islamic schools of jurisprudence. It is considered a sign of belonging to the wider Muslim community (Ummah).

Islamic male circumcision is analogous but not identical to Jewish circumcision. Muslims are currently the largest single religious group in which the practice is widespread, although circumcision is never mentioned in the Quran itself but is mentioned in the ḥadīth literature and sunnah (accounts of the sayings and living habits attributed to the Islamic prophet Muhammad during his lifetime). Whether or not it should be carried out after converting to Islam is debated among Muslim legal scholars (Ulama).

Religious sources

The Quran itself does not mention circumcision explicitly in any verse. In the time of the Islamic prophet Muhammad, both male and female circumcision were carried out by Pagan Arabian tribes, and male circumcision by the Jewish tribes of Arabia for religious reasons. This has also been attested by the classical Muslim scholar al-Jāḥiẓ, as well as by the Roman-Jewish historian Flavius Josephus.

According to some ḥadīth reports, Muhammad was born without a foreskin (a birth defect and medical condition known as aposthia), while others maintain that his grandfather, ʿAbd al-Muṭṭalib, circumcised him when he was seven days old. Some ḥadīth report that Heraclius, Emperor of the Byzantine Empire, had referred to Muhammad as "the king of the circumcised".

Some ḥadīth reports mention circumcision in a list of practices known as fitra (acts considered to be of a refined person). Abū Hurayra, one of the companions of Muhammad, was quoted saying: "five things are fitra: circumcision, shaving pubic hair with a razor, trimming the mustache, paring one's nails and plucking the hair from one's armpits" (reported in  the ḥadīth of Sahih al-Bukhari and Sahih Muslim). However, there are other ḥadīth which don't name circumcision as part of the characteristics of fitra, and yet another ḥadīth which names ten characteristics, again without naming circumcision; in Sahih Muslim, Aisha, one of Muhammad's wives, is quoted with saying: "The Messenger of Allah (may peace be upon him) said: Ten are the acts according to fitra: clipping the mustache, letting the beard grow, using toothpicks, snuffing water in the nose, cutting the nails, washing the finger joints, plucking the hair under the armpits, shaving pubic hair and cleaning one's private parts with water. The narrator said: I have forgotten the tenth, but it may have been rinsing the mouth." Hence, the different hadiths do not agree on whether circumcision is part of fitra or not.

Muhammad's wife Aisha supposedly quoted Muhammad as saying that "if the two circumcised parts have been in touch with one another, ghusl is necessary". According to some other ḥadīth reports, Muhammad supposedly circumcised his grandsons, Ḥasan ibn ʿAlī and Ḥusayn ibn ʿAlī, on the seventh day after their birth.
Sahih al-Bukhari and Sahih Muslim also quote from Muhammad that Abraham allegedly performed his own circumcision at the age of eighty. It is also reported by Abū Dāwūd and Aḥmad ibn Ḥanbal that Muhammad stated that circumcision was a "law for men and a preservation of honor for women".

Circumcision was introduced to many lands of the Middle East and North Africa for the first time through Islam itself following the early Muslim conquests under the Rāshidūn Caliphate, whose commanders were the companions and contemporaries of Muhammad. An example are the Persians, which practiced neither male nor female circumcision before the advent of Islam. Post-Islamic converts such as Afshin were found guilty in trials of remaining uncircumcised.

Despite its common practice in Muslim-majority nations, circumcision is considered to be sunnah (tradition) and not required for a life directed by Allah. According to historians of religion and scholars of Religious studies, the Islamic tradition of circumcision was derived from the Pagan practices and rituals of pre-Islamic Arabia, and is never mentioned in the Quran. Shīʿīte traditions, however, such as those practised in Iran, have the most stringent requirements for male circumcision, since it is seen as a ritual of purification akin to Christian baptism rather than an initiation to adulthood.

Sunnī Islam
In the Sunnī branch of Islam, the four schools of Islamic jurisprudence have different opinions and attitudes towards circumcision: some state that it's recommendable, others that it's permissible but not binding, while others regard it as a legal obligation. Amongst Muslim legal scholars (Ulama), there are differing opinions about the compulsory or non-obligatory status of circumcision in accordance with the Islamic law (sharīʿa). Aḥmad ibn Ḥanbal (founder of the Ḥanbalī school), Abū Ḥanīfa al-Nuʿmān (founder of the Ḥanafī school), and Mālik ibn Anas (founder of the Mālikī school) all maintain that circumcision is not obligatory; cleansing of the foreskin is recommended instead. The Shāfiʿī school instead regards it as binding on all Muslims, both males and females. According to Shāfiʿī and Ḥanbalī jurists both male and female circumcision are legally obligatory for Muslims, although Ḥanafī jurists also consider circumcision to be recommendable exclusively for Muslim males on the seventh day after birth. Some Salafis have argued that circumcision is required in Islam to provide ritual cleanliness based on the covenant with Abraham, while the purpose of female circumcision for Muslim women is to "regulate" and reduce their sexual desires.

Shīʿa Islam
Within the Shīʿīte branch of Islam, most Shīʿīte denominations regard the practice as obligatory. They rely on sayings that come from classical Shīʿīte Muslim scholars. In one narration Muhammad was asked if an uncircumcised man could go to pilgrimage. He answered "not as long as he is not circumcised". They quote ʿAlī ibn Abī Ṭālib as saying: "If a man becomes Muslim, he must submit to circumcision even if he is 80 years old." Another narration from  Jaʿfar al-Ṣādiq, the 6th Shīʿīte Imam, says: "Circumcise your sons when they are seven days old as it is cleaner (athar) and the flesh grows faster and because the earth hates the urine of the uncircumcised." It is also believed that the urine of the uncircumcised is impure, while if one prays with unclean genitals their prayer may not be considered as acceptable, even of those who have been circumcised, meaning that it may have to be repeated again at a time when the believer has purified themselves and removed the impurity. Another hadith attributed to Muhammad states: "the earth cries out to God in anguish because of the urine of the uncircumcised", and that "the earth becomes defiled from the urine of the uncircumcised for forty days".

Time for circumcision

Islamic sources do not fix a particular time for circumcision. Therefore, there is a wide variation in practice among Muslim communities, with children often being circumcised in late childhood or early adolescence. It depends on family, region, and country. The preferred age is usually seven, although some Muslims are circumcised as early as on the seventh day after birth and as late as at the commencement of puberty.

Procedure
There is no fixed age for circumcision in Islam, and the age when boys get circumcised, and the procedures used, tends to change across countries, cultures, families, and time.  In some Muslim-majority countries, circumcision is performed on Muslim boys after they have learned to recite the whole Quran from start to finish.

Circumcisions are usually carried out in health facilities or hospitals, and performed by trained medical practitioners. The circumciser can be either male or female, and is not required to be a Muslim.

Celebrations

The occasion is widely celebrated in Turkey and called "Sünnet Töreni", which marks the child's transition to adulthood. The custom is also done in Muslim areas in the Balkans where the celebration is called "Synet".

Confusion with female circumcision

Due to the dual gender use of the word khitan in Arabic, Female genital mutilation (FGM) is sometimes referred to as khitan by its proponents in an effort to seek justification for the practice in Islamic scripture. This interpretation is incorrect, however, as the Islamic use of terminology is restricted to male circumcision. The more precise Arabic term for specifically 'female circumcision' or FGM is Khafḍ. In many communities, khafd is a rite of passage and refers to excision of the female genital organs. According to UNICEF, over 200 million women in Africa, the Middle East and North Africa, and Southeast Asia have been subjected to the practice and are living with FGM. It is not in the Quran, and the Islamic position on it was historically unclear, with a few 'weak' hadith encouraging it, and others discouraging it.

In 2007, in a landmark ruling on the practice, the authoritative Al-Azhar Supreme Council of Islamic Research in Cairo declared that FGM has "no basis in core Islamic law or any of its partial provisions".

See also

References

Quotations

Citations

External links
 
 
 

Circumcision
Islamic jurisprudence
Islam-related controversies
Islamic terminology
Violence against men